Pentiment is an adventure video game by Obsidian Entertainment and published by Xbox Game Studios. The game was released on November 15, 2022, for Windows, Xbox One and Xbox Series X/S platforms.

Gameplay
Pentiment is a narrative adventure 2D role-playing video game set in Duchy of Bavaria, in a fictional Alpine town of Tassing and its nearby abbey, in early to middle 16th century. The player is tasked with investigating a series of murders of prominent individuals for which other townsfolk have been accused for various reasons. After collecting physical proof and gleaning information from townsfolk, the player is meant to accuse an individual based on either who they think committed the crime or who most deserves punishment. Concurrent with the overarching murder plot are other crimes and conspiracies as well as insights into the history of the area.

The game's art style is a mix of late medieval manuscripts, early print, and woodcuts at the transition from late medieval to early modern art. The music for the game was composed and performed by Alkemie Early Music Ensemble. As game director Josh Sawyer says, "[Alkemie is] a music group, they compose and record as an ensemble...the music they've contributed to the game is either strictly historical or historically inspired." Lingua Ignota also composed the song "Ein Traum" for the game.

Plot 
In 1518, Andreas Maler is serving an apprenticeship as an illuminator at Kiersau Abbey, outside the small Upper Bavarian town of Tassing. One day in April, Baron Lorenz Rothvogel, a friend of the Prince-Bishop of Freising and longtime benefactor of Kiersau, pays a visit to check on the progress of a manuscript he commissioned. He openly expresses dissatisfaction with the style of the manuscript's illuminator, the elderly Brother Piero, and insists that Andreas complete the remaining illustrations. The next day, Rothvogel is found stabbed to death in the abbey's chapter house. Concerned that the baron's murder could damage the abbey's reputation and lead to its dissolution, Abbot Gernot assumes Piero, who was the first to discover the body, committed the crime and has him detained until Jacob Estler, archdeacon to the prince-bishop, can conduct an inquiry. Andreas believes Piero is innocent, however, and begins an investigation of his own.

Development 
Game developer Josh Sawyer first pitched Pentiment to Feargus Urquhart when they worked at Black Isle Studios. Sawyer was inspired by the historical fiction of Darklands, a 1992 role-playing video game by MicroProse that combined the Middle Ages with supernatural themes. Urquhart thought it would have little appeal outside of history afficionados. Sawyer pitched Urquhart again, years later, when they both worked at Obsidian Entertainment, following the release of the 2018 Pillars of Eternity II: Deadfire. He reframed the game as a narrative adventure with mystery components and gameplay similar to Night in the Woods or Oxenfree. The small development team was commensurate with the game's niche attraction. Sawyer credited art director Hannah Kennedy's art style and interest in the concept as being vital to the project's early support. The team looked at illuminated medieval manuscripts in the Getty Museum and Huntington Library in California for inspiration, as well as consulting with manuscript experts such as Christopher de Hamel. They initially worked as a team of two, later the team was expanded to 13 people. Edmund Kern, Christopher de Hamel, and Winston E. Black are medieval historians who served as consultants on the project.

Microsoft's acquisition of Obsidian in 2018 brought the game accessibility and localization support, such as a mode with typefaces easier to read, features like text to speech, and robust translations for non-English speakers in a text-heavy game.

Pentiment was released on November 15, 2022, for Xbox and Windows platforms.

Reception 

Pentiment received "generally favorable reviews", according to the review aggregator Metacritic.

IGN praised the time pressure mechanic, saying it made the game more tense and added replayability "you're never given enough time to pursue them all [leads]. This added some welcome tension and forced me to make a lot of interesting decisions". Destructoid liked how there was no "golden route" and you had benefits and downsides with each choice made. GamesRadar+ loved the setting, feeling it captured the anxiety of the time, "the dawning of a new age is palpable, and the struggle to come to terms with it rumbles furiously throughout, whether from monks still painstakingly scribing tomes... or young firebrands who've learned to read and question authority". While criticizing the unclear choice mechanic, PC Gamer enjoyed the town characters and the role that they play in the story, "over 25 years of chats, shared meals... That makes it all the harder when you want to condemn a family man for a crime he might not actually have committed". 

The Guardian liked the writing of the game, "The dialogue drips with fascinating historical detail, supported by an extensive glossary of terms". PCGamesN disliked the pacing, saying it was "told at something between walking pace and the movement of tectonic plates". Polygon praised the art style, feeling the drawings "immediately bring a sense of style to what otherwise might be a dry history".

Accolades

References

Further reading

External links
 

2022 video games
Adventure games
Obsidian Entertainment games
Role-playing video games
Video games set in the 16th century
Video games set in Germany
Video games developed in the United States
Windows games
Xbox One games
Xbox Series X and Series S games
Microsoft games